Germantown Friends School (GFS) is a coeducational independent PreK–12 school in the Germantown neighborhood of Philadelphia, Pennsylvania, in the United States under the supervision of Germantown Monthly Meeting of the Religious Society of Friends (Quakers). It is governed by a School Committee whose members are drawn from the membership of the Meeting, the school's alumni and parents of current students and alumni. The head of school is Dana Weeks.

History 

Germantown Friends School was founded in 1845 by Germantown Monthly Meeting. The school was founded in response to a request from the Philadelphia Yearly Meeting. Until the early 20th century, Germantown Friends was a "select" school, meaning that only the children of Quaker parents were admitted. Germantown Monthly Meeting was an Orthodox meeting and valued classical education. Athletics and the arts were considered a diversion from the essentials needed by young people.

Notable alumni

Entertainment
 The main character from the TV series Twin Peaks, FBI Agent Dale Cooper, supposedly grew up in Germantown and attended Germantown Friends School (as created by director David Lynch, who spent many years in Philadelphia). They were also referenced in The Goldbergs' spinoff show, Schooled, in the fifth episode of the first season, "Money for RENT."

References

External links
Germantown Friends School

Quaker schools in Pennsylvania
Educational institutions established in 1845
High schools in Philadelphia
Private high schools in Pennsylvania
Private middle schools in Pennsylvania
Private elementary schools in Pennsylvania
1845 establishments in Pennsylvania
Germantown, Philadelphia